The 2022–23 Austrian Cup is the 92nd edition of the national cup in Austrian football. The champions of the cup will earn a place in the 2023–24 Europa League play-off round. The final will be held on 1 May 2023 in Klagenfurt.

Red Bull Salzburg are the defending champions, having defeated SV Ried in the 2022 final.

Match times up to 30 October 2022 and from 26 March 2023 were CEST (UTC+2). Times on interim ("winter") days were CET (UTC+1).

Round dates 
The schedule of the competition is as follows.

First round 
Thirty-two first round matches were played between 15 July and 19 July 2022.

Second round 
Sixteen second round matches will be played 30 August to 1 September 2022. The draw was held on Friday, July 22 by ORF domestic policy chief Hans Bürger.

Third round 
Eight third round matches will be played 17 October 2022. The draw was held on Sunday, 4 August 2022. As part of the ORF program "Sport am Sonntag", the draw was conducted by Austrian bobsleigh pilot Katrin Beierl.

Quarter-finals 
Four Quarter-final matches will be played from February 3rd to 5th, 2023. The draw was held on Sunday, 23 October 2022. As part of the ORF program "Sport am Sonntag" and was conducted by Judo Olympic and World Championships bronze medalist Shamil Borchashvili.

Semi-finals 
Two Semi-Final matches will be played between April 4-6, 2023. The draw was held as part of the ORF program "Sport am Sonntag" and was drawn by Austrian ski racer Nina Ortlieb

Final

Top goalscorers

See also 
 2022–23 Austrian Football Bundesliga
 2022–23 Austrian Football Second League

References

External links 
 UNIQA ÖFB Cup on OFB.at

Austrian Cup seasons
Cup
Austrian Cup